Son of Schweinstein is a remix EP by Schwein.  Released following Schweinstein, Son of Schweinstein features remixes of tracks found on Schweinstein.

Track listing

Schwein albums
2001 remix albums
2001 EPs
Remix EPs